Zachery Quinn Fulton (born September 23, 1991) is a former American football guard who played in the National Football League (NFL). He was drafted by the Kansas City Chiefs in the sixth round of the 2014 NFL Draft. He played college football at the University of Tennessee. He has also played for the Houston Texans.

Professional career

Kansas City Chiefs
Fulton was drafted by the Kansas City Chiefs in the sixth round, 193rd overall, in the 2014 NFL Draft. He won a starting spot during the Chiefs' training camp in August 2014, and made his NFL debut in the Chiefs' season-opening loss to Tennessee on September 7, 2014. He was the Chiefs' first sixth-round pick to start in the opening game of his rookie season in 30 years. He finished his rookie season starting all 16 games for the Chiefs.

In 2017, Fulton played in 15 games, starting 12 at center and at both guard spots throughout the season following injuries to starters Mitch Morse, Laurent Duvernay-Tardif and Bryan Witzmann.

Houston Texans
On March 15, 2018, the Houston Texans signed Fulton to a four-year, $28 million contract that includes $13 million guaranteed. He was named the starting right guard to start the season, and started 13 games there. In 2019, Fulton started 15 games at right guard, and started all 16 at right guard in 2020.

Fulton was released by the Texans on March 17, 2021.

New York Giants
Fulton signed with the New York Giants on March 25, 2021.

Fulton announced his retirement from football on August 6, 2021.

References

External links
Kansas City Chiefs bio
Tennessee Volunteers bio

1991 births
Living people
American football offensive guards
Houston Texans players
Kansas City Chiefs players
New York Giants players
People from Homewood, Illinois
Players of American football from Illinois
Sportspeople from Cook County, Illinois
Tennessee Volunteers football players
Homewood-Flossmoor High School alumni